The 1995 Junior League World Series took place from August 14–19 in Taylor, Michigan, United States. Lake Charles, Louisiana defeated Northridge, California in the championship game.

Teams

Results

References

Junior League World Series
Junior League World Series
Junior